James Louis Bivins, (December 6, 1919 – July 4, 2012) was an American light heavyweight boxer whose professional career ran from 1940 to 1955. He was born in Dry Branch, Georgia. Although he was never given the opportunity to fight for a world title, despite at one point being the number one contender in both the light heavyweight and heavyweight divisions, Bivins fought and defeated many of the great fighters of his era and won the "Duration" Light Heavyweight and Heavyweight titles. In recognition of his achievements in the ring - among other things, he defeated eight of the eleven world champions he faced - Bivins was inducted into the International Boxing Hall of Fame in 1999. He was also the one-time husband of Dollree Mapp, the subject of prominent Supreme Court case regarding the rights of search and seizures.

Boxing career
Although he was born in Georgia, Bivins fought out of Cleveland, Ohio for the entirety of his career. He made his professional debut on January 15, 1940, winning by knockout in the first round, and went on to win his first nineteen fights, all fought in 1940, before losing a split decision to Anton Christoforidis, whom he had previously beaten. Bivins won his first four fights of 1941, including contests with Teddy Yarosz and Curtis Sheppard, but lost three of his other four contests that year, which included a points loss to Melio Bettina.  He began 1942 with wins against Billy Soose and Gus Lesnevich and a split-decision loss to Bob Pastor.  After this loss, Bivins had a twenty-seven fight undefeated streak that lasted for four years; it was during this period that Bivins established himself as one of the great heavyweights of his era - a remarkable achievement given that, at 5' 9", he was often significantly smaller than his opponents.

Bivins first fight after losing to Pastor was a split-decision win against Joey Maxim, a fellow Cleveland fighter who went on to become a member of the hall of fame.  Bivins fought four more contests in 1942, including a rematch with Bob Pastor and a bout with Lee Savold, and won them all.  He began 1943 with a remarkable win against Ezzard Charles, in which he recorded seven knockdowns against the future heavyweight world champion.  On February 23, 1943 he defeated Anton Christoforidis on points for the duration light heavyweight title - as all the world titles had been frozen for the duration of World War II, this was the closest he ever came to holding a world title.  In the three years after this fight Bivins went on to defeat Tami Mauriello, Pat Valentino, Lloyd Marshall, Melio Bettina, Curtis Sheppard and Archie Moore, whom he knocked-down six times en route to a knockout victory.  Bivins served with the United States Army from March, 1944 until his honorable discharge in November of the same year - during 1944 he fought only one professional fight, a points victory over Lee Q. Murray.

On February 25, 1946 Bivins fought Jersey Joe Walcott at the Cleveland Arena.  The fight was Bivins' first loss in four years, the split decision was interesting in that one official had the fight 6-4 to Bivins, the second had it 9-1 to Walcott and the last had it 5-4-1 to Bivins but gave the fight to Walcott because of a third round knockdown in his favour.  After losing his long unbeaten streak, Bivins' record as a fighter became somewhat average.  After his loss to Walcott, Bivins went on to lose his next two contests, against Lee Q. Murray and Ezzard Charles, before winning the following four.  Bivins suffered a knockout loss to Ezzard Charles on March 10, 1947 and went on to lose a further two of his final seven fights that year, to Lee Q. Murray and Archie Moore.  He went on to win six of his nine fights in 1948, losing only to Joey Maxim, Ezzard Charles and Archie Moore. In 1949 he won five of his eight fights, but lost to both Archie Moore and Harold Johnson. He only fought twice in 1950, but returned to fighting regularly the following year. In 1951 he defeated Ted Lowry on points, but was once again knocked-out by Archie Moore and lost by unanimous decision to both Joe Louis and the undefeated Bob Baker.  Bivins had a further eleven fights after his loss to Baker, and won eight of them.  His only big-name opponent during these final fights was Ezzard Charles, who won by decision on November 26, 1952.  Bivins retired following a victory over the journeyman Chubby Wright in June 1953, but returned for two final fights, both of which he won, a couple of years later.

Retirement and later life
Following his retirement, Bivins earned a living as a bakery truck driver.  In his spare time, he coached young people in boxing.  Bivins' first two marriages ended in divorce.  His third wife, Elizabeth, died in 1995.  In April 1998, Bivins was discovered living in the unheated attic of his daughter and son in law's home in Collinwood, wrapped in a urine and feces caked blanket.  The former boxer's weight had dwindled to 110 pounds. Bivins was then moved into his sister's home in Shaker Heights.  In 2009, Bivins was moved into MacGregor Home, a care facility for the elderly. He died in 2012 at the age of 92 in Cleveland, Ohio.

Awards and honors
Entered into Greater Cleveland Sports Hall of Fame in 1978
Entered into The Canadian Boxing Hall of Fame in 1988
Entered into The World Boxing Hall of Fame in 1994
Entered into The International Boxing Hall of Fame (class of 1999)
Jimmy Bivins Park dedicated in Cleveland (2000)
Entered into The California Boxing Hall of Fame 2015

Professional boxing record

References

External links
 
 WCPN interview

1919 births
2012 deaths
Boxers from Georgia (U.S. state)
Boxers from Ohio
Sportspeople from Shaker Heights, Ohio
People from Twiggs County, Georgia
Heavyweight boxers
Light-heavyweight boxers
International Boxing Hall of Fame inductees
Deaths from pneumonia in Ohio
American male boxers
United States Army personnel of World War II
African-American boxers
African Americans in World War II
21st-century African-American sportspeople
African-American United States Army personnel